Ymer is the fifth and last icebreaker in the . She was launched in late 1976, and on 25 October 1977 she was delivered to the Swedish Navy and departed the Wärtsilä Helsinki Shipyard bound for Stockholm, where she arrived on 3 November.

References 
 PDF from Swedish Maritime Administration 
Newspaper article about Ymer 

Ships built in Helsinki
Icebreakers of Sweden
1976 ships
Atle-class icebreakers